The little big-eyed bat (Chiroderma trinitatum) is a bat species from South and Central America.

References

Bats of South America
Bats of Brazil
Mammals of Colombia
Chiroderma
Mammals described in 1958